Francisco Lisboa (born 1 May 1965) is an Indonesian boxer. He competed in the men's welterweight event at the 1984 Summer Olympics.

References

1965 births
Living people
Indonesian male boxers
Olympic boxers of Indonesia
Boxers at the 1984 Summer Olympics
Place of birth missing (living people)
Southeast Asian Games medalists in boxing
Welterweight boxers
20th-century Indonesian people